Ndogo may refer to:
 Ndogo people
 Ndogo language

Language and nationality disambiguation pages